Kieran Brookes (born 29 August 1990) is an English rugby union player who plays for Toulon and England. He usually plays as a tighthead prop, but can also cover as a loosehead prop. He was educated at Kirkham Grammar School.

Club career
Brookes made almost 40 senior appearances for Newcastle but only started 1 game in the 2009–2010 season.

Brookes moved to Leicester Tigers for the 2011–12 season.

Having returned to the Newcastle Falcons on loan from Leicester Tigers in March 2013, he signed a two-year contract to stay with the Falcons in April 2013.

On 13 January 2015, it was announced that Brookes would be joining Northampton Saints at the end of the 2014-15 season.

Brookes became a regular starter for the East Midlands side and racked up numerous appearances at his time at Saints.

The prop helped Saints to secure European Champions Cup rugby for the 2017/18 season, featuring in both play-off games as Saints beat Connacht Rugby and Stade Francais to seal the last spot in the top tier of European rugby for the following season.

On 13 June 2018, Brookes signed for Premiership rivals Wasps from the 2018-19 season.

On 9 June 2021, it was widely confirmed that Brookes would leave Wasps at the end of the season to join top French side Toulon in the Top 14 competition ahead of the 2021-22 season.

International career

Brookes has committed himself to the  rugby team, playing for England in an uncapped match against the Barbarians and for the England Saxons in their successful Churchill Cup campaign in the summer of 2011. In May 2014 he was called up to England's training squad for the tour of New Zealand, where he earned himself his first two caps for his country.

Since making his senior debut for England in that tour, Brookes has taken to the field for England 16 times. He was a member of the 2015 Rugby World Cup squad and was included in the squad for the 2016 Six Nations and after joining the squad on 1 February, coming back from an injury, helped his country to a Grand Slam victory.

The summer of 2016 saw Brookes become part of the England Saxons squad once more where he travelled to South Africa to face South Africa 'A' where the men in white secured a 2-0 series win.

References

External links
Newcastle Falcons profile
England profile

1990 births
Living people
Doncaster R.F.C. players
England international rugby union players
English people of Irish descent
English rugby union players
Leicester Tigers players
Newcastle Falcons players
People educated at Kirkham Grammar School
Rugby union players from Stoke-on-Trent
Rugby union props